Sanqalan (known as Leninabad until 1992) is a village in the Agsu Rayon of Azerbaijan.  The village forms part of the municipality of Nüydü.

References 

Populated places in Agsu District